Doctor Syntax is an album by Scottish musician Edwyn Collins. It was released in 2002. Its title comes from The Three Tours of Dr. Syntax, a comic poem by William Combe and cartoonist Thomas Rowlandson.

The album cover is a painting of Russian Romantic writer and poet Mikhail Lermontov.

Track listing
All tracks composed by Edwyn Collins; except where indicated
"Never Felt Like This" – 4:15
"Should've Done That" – 4:23
"Mine Is At" – 4:58
"No Idea" – 4:51
"The Beatles" – 5:24
"Back to the Back Room" – 5:15
"Splitting Up" – 6:21
"Johnny Teardrop" – 4:11
"20 Years Too Late" – 5:06
"It's a Funny Thing" – 4:23
"Calling on You" – 4:48
"Message for Jojo" (Collins, Bernard Butler)
"After All (I Live My Life)" (Frankie Miller, Jim Morris)
"Stars in My Eyes"

Personnel
Edwyn Collins - vocals
Sebastian Lewsley - programming, engineering, mixing
Paul Cook - drums

References

2002 albums
Edwyn Collins albums
Setanta Records albums
Albums produced by Edwyn Collins